Edgar Garland Braxton (June 10, 1900 – February 25, 1966) was an American professional baseball player.  He was a pitcher over parts of 10 seasons (1921–1933) with the Boston Braves, New York Yankees, Washington Senators, Chicago White Sox and St. Louis Browns.  He led the American League in ERA in 1928 while playing for Washington. For his career, he compiled a 50–53 record in 282 appearances, with a 4.13 ERA and 412 strikeouts.

See also
 List of Major League Baseball annual saves leaders

External links

1900 births
1966 deaths
Major League Baseball pitchers
American League ERA champions
Baseball players from North Carolina
Binghamton Triplets managers
Boston Braves players
New York Yankees players
Washington Senators (1901–1960) players
Chicago White Sox players
St. Louis Browns players
People from Snow Camp, North Carolina
Radford Rockets players
Minor league baseball managers
Greensboro Patriots players
Indianapolis Indians players
Little Rock Travelers players
Milwaukee Brewers (minor league) players
Norfolk Tars players
Springfield Ponies players
Winston-Salem Twins players
Worcester Panthers players